Schizogenius is a genus of beetles in the family Carabidae, containing the following species:

 Schizogenius amphibius (Haldeman, 1843)
 Schizogenius apicalis Putzeys, 1861
 Schizogenius arechavaletae Putzeys, 1866
 Schizogenius arimao Darlington, 1934
 Schizogenius auripennis H. W. Bates, 1881
 Schizogenius baenningeri Kult, 1950
 Schizogenius basalis Putzeys, 1866
 Schizogenius bicolor Whitehead, 1972
 Schizogenius brevicornis (Brullé, 1837)
 Schizogenius brevisetosus Whitehead, 1972
 Schizogenius capitalis Putzeys, 1861
 Schizogenius carinatus Whitehead, 1966
 Schizogenius cearaensis Whitehead, 1972
 Schizogenius chiricahuanus Whitehead, 1972
 Schizogenius clivinoides Putzeys, 1866
 Schizogenius costiceps Steinheil, 1869
 Schizogenius costipennis Whitehead, 1972
 Schizogenius crenulatus Leconte, 1852
 Schizogenius darlingtoni Kult, 1950
 Schizogenius depressus Leconte, 1852
 Schizogenius dilatus Whitehead, 1972
 Schizogenius dyschirioides Putzeys, 1861
 Schizogenius elongatus Kult, 1950
 Schizogenius emdeni Whitehead, 1972
 Schizogenius falli Whitehead, 1972
 Schizogenius ferrugineus Putzeys, 1846
 Schizogenius freyi Baehr, 1983
 Schizogenius gracilis Putzeys, 1846
 Schizogenius impressicollis Putzeys, 1846
 Schizogenius impuncticollis Whitehead, 1972
 Schizogenius interstriatus Putzeys, 1878
 Schizogenius iridescens (Putzeys, 1866)
 Schizogenius janae Kult, 1950
 Schizogenius kulti Whitehead, 1972
 Schizogenius leprieuri (Laporte, 1835)
 Schizogenius lindrothi Whitehead, 1972
 Schizogenius lineolatus (Say, 1823)
 Schizogenius litigiosus Fall, 1901
 Schizogenius longipennis Putzeys, 1866
 Schizogenius maculatus Kult, 1950
 Schizogenius multipunctatus Kult, 1950
 Schizogenius multisetosus H. W. Bates, 1891
 Schizogenius negrei Whitehead, 1972
 Schizogenius neovalidus Whitehead, 1972
 Schizogenius ocellatus Whitehead, 1972
 Schizogenius ochthocephalus Whitehead, 1972
 Schizogenius optimus H. W. Bates, 1881
 Schizogenius ozarkensis Whitehead, 1972
 Schizogenius pacificus Whitehead, 1972
 Schizogenius planulatus Leconte, 1863
 Schizogenius planuloides Whitehead, 1972
 Schizogenius pluripunctatus Leconte, 1852
 Schizogenius plurisetosus Whitehead, 1972
 Schizogenius putzeysii Kirsch, 1873
 Schizogenius pygmaeus Van Dyke, 1925
 Schizogenius quadripunctatus Putzeys, 1866
 Schizogenius quinquesulcatus Putzeys, 1861
 Schizogenius reichardti Whitehead, 1972
 Schizogenius riparius Putzeys, 1878
 Schizogenius sallei Putzeys, 1866
 Schizogenius scopaeus Whitehead, 1972
 Schizogenius sculptilis Whitehead, 1972
 Schizogenius sellatus Putzeys, 1866
 Schizogenius seticollis Fall, 1901
 Schizogenius strigicollis Putzeys, 1846
 Schizogenius sulcatulus Putzeys, 1846
 Schizogenius sulcifrons Putzeys, 1846
 Schizogenius suturalis Whitehead, 1972
 Schizogenius szekessyi Kult, 1950
 Schizogenius tenuis H. W. Bates, 1881
 Schizogenius tibialis Whitehead, 1972
 Schizogenius tristriatus Putzeys, 1846
 Schizogenius truquii Putzeys, 1866
 Schizogenius whiteheadi Nichols, 1982
 Schizogenius xanthopus (Brullé, 1837)

References

Scaritinae